The Journal of Ancient Judaism is a peer-reviewed academic journal established in 2010. It covers "Jewish literature, culture, religion, and history from the Babylonian exile until the Babylonian Talmud." It is published three times a year by Brill. The editors-in-chief are Angela Kim Harkins and Jonathan Klawans.

The journal is abstracted and indexed in Scopus.

References

Publications established in 2010
Judaic studies journals
Brill Publishers academic journals
Triannual journals